Josué Casimir (born 24 September 2001) is a Guadeloupean footballer who plays as a forward for French Ligue 2 club Le Havre.

Professional career
Casimir made his professional debut with Le Havre in a 1-0 Ligue 2 win over USL Dunkerque on 24 October 2020.

International career
Casimir was born in the French overseas department Guadeloupe, and is of Haitian descent. He represented the Guadeloupe U20s at the 2020 CONCACAF U-20 Championship qualifying matches, with 3 goals in 3 games.

Personal life
Casimir is the brother of the Guadeloupean international footballer Stevenson Casimir.

References

External links
 

2001 births
Living people
People from Pointe-à-Pitre
Association football forwards
Guadeloupean footballers
French footballers
Guadeloupean people of Haitian descent
French sportspeople of Haitian descent
Le Havre AC players
Ligue 2 players
Championnat National 2 players
Championnat National 3 players
Guadeloupe youth international footballers